The Sea Hawk is a 1924 American silent adventure film about an English noble sold into slavery who escapes and turns himself into a pirate king. Directed by Frank Lloyd, the screen adaptation was written by J. G. Hawks based upon the 1915 Rafael Sabatini novel of the same name. It premiered on June 2, 1924, in New York City, twelve days before its theatrical debut.

Plot
At the instigation of his half brother Lionel (Lloyd Hughes), Oliver Tressilian (Milton Sills), a wealthy baronet, is shanghaied and blamed for the death of Peter Godolphin (Wallace MacDonald), brother of Oliver's fiancée, whom Lionel actually has slain.  At sea Oliver is captured by Spaniards and made a galley slave, but when he escapes to the Moors he becomes Sakr-el-Bahr, the scourge of Christendom. Learning of Rosamund's (Enid Bennett) impending marriage to his half brother, he kidnaps both of them, but to avoid the risk of giving her to Asad-ed-Din (Frank Currier), the Basha of Algiers, he surrenders to a British ship. Rosamund intercedes to save his life, and following the death of Lionel they are married.

Cast

 Milton Sills as Sir Oliver Tressilian 
 Enid Bennett as Lady Rosamund Godolphin 
 Lloyd Hughes as Lionel Tressilian 
 Wallace Beery as Capt. Jasper Leigh 
 Marc McDermott as Sir John Killigrew
 Wallace MacDonald as Peter Godolphin 
 Bert Woodruff as Nick 
 Claire Du Brey as Siren 
 Lionel Belmore as Justice Anthony Baine 
 Cristina Montt as The Infanta of Spain 
 Albert Prisco as Yusuf-Ben-Moktar 
 Frank Currier as Asad-ed-Din
 William Collier Jr. as Marsak 
 Medea Radzina as Fenzileh 
 Fred DeSilva as Ali 
 Kathleen Key as Andalusian Slave Girl 
 Hector Sarno as Tsmanni
 Robert Bolder as Ayoub 
 Fred Spencer as Boatswain
 S.E. Jennings as Captain of Asad's Guards
 Henry A. Barrows as Bishop (uncredited)
 Carl D. Bruner as Undetermined Secondary Role (uncredited)
 Edwards Davis as Chief Justice of England (uncredited)
 Andrew Johnston as Sir Walter (uncredited)
 Theodore Lorch as Turkish Merchant (uncredited)
 Louis Morrison as Innkeeper (uncredited)
 George O'Brien as Galley Slave (uncredited)
 Kate Price as Innkeeper's Wife (uncredited)
 George Romain as Spanish Commander (uncredited)
 Walter Wilkinson as Oliver's Young Son (uncredited)
 Nancy Zann as Spanish Slave Girl (uncredited)

Production
Director Frank Lloyd recognized that moviegoers of 1924 would be put off by miniature models, and instructed that full-sized ships be created for use in the film at a cost of $200,000. This was done by outfitting the wooden exteriors of existing craft to the design of Fred Gabourie, known for his work in constructing props used in Buster Keaton films. The ocean scenes were filmed off the coast of California's Catalina Island, with 150 tents set up on the island for housing and support of the film's 1,000 extras, 21 technicians, 14 actors, and 64 sailors.

A movie with the same title (but an entirely different plot) was released in 1940, starring Errol Flynn. The studio used some key scenes from battles in the 1924 film. They spliced the scenes into the 1940 film, thinking they could not have been done better. The life-sized replicas were considered so well recreated, that Warner Bros. repeatedly used them in later nautical films.

Reception
When the film was released, a New York Times critic called it, "far and away the best sea story that's yet been done up to that point".  It held that unofficial status for years.

In other media
The film is referenced in The Lost World (1925) when the explorers return to London and there is a shot of the London Pavilion with a flashing sign advertising a showing of The Sea Hawk.

Some of the film's sea-battle footage was used in the 1935 film Captain Blood.

References

External links

 
 
 
 
 Lobby poster
 Fritzi Kramer, The Sea Hawk (1924) A Silent Film Review at moviessilently.com

1924 films
American silent feature films
American black-and-white films
Films based on British novels
Films directed by Frank Lloyd
Films set in the Mediterranean Sea
Pirate films
American swashbuckler films
First National Pictures films
1920s historical adventure films
American historical adventure films
1920s American films
Silent historical adventure films
1920s English-language films